Clube Ferroviário da Beira may refer to:

 Clube Ferroviário da Beira (basketball), basketball section of the multi-sports club
 Clube Ferroviário da Beira (football), football section of the multi-sports club